Protein LDOC1 is a protein that in humans is encoded by the LDOC1 gene.

Function 

The protein encoded by this gene contains a leucine zipper-like motif and a proline-rich region that shares marked similarity with an SH3-binding domain. The protein localizes to the nucleus and is down-regulated in some cancer cell lines. It is thought to regulate the transcriptional response mediated by the nuclear factor kappa B (NF-kappaB). The gene has been proposed as a tumor suppressor gene whose protein product may have an important role in the development and/or progression of some cancers.

Interactions 

LDOC1 has been shown to interact with ABLIM1.

References

Further reading